Vision Forum was an evangelical Christian organization based in San Antonio, Texas. It was founded in 1998; its president was Doug Phillips, son of U.S. Constitution Party leader Howard Phillips. Vision Forum Ministries was a 501(c) non-profit organization which was closed by its board of directors in November 2013 after Doug Phillips' confession of marital infidelity and allegations of sexual abuse. The associated commercial operation, called Vision Forum, Inc., continued to operate until January 2014, when it was announced that it too was shutting down operations. Vision Forum advocated 
for Biblical patriarchy, creationism, homeschooling, Family Integrated Churches, and Quiverfull beliefs.

Events 
The organization sponsored the Christian Filmmakers Academy and the San Antonio Independent Christian Film Festival.

In 2007, the group organized an alternative celebration of the 400th anniversary of the founding of Jamestown, Virginia, saying that the official celebration did not give enough emphasis to the Christian perspective of the settlers.

Criticism 
Vision Forum was criticized for holding views that were demeaning of women and viewed them as property.

Similar criticisms were voiced when a lawsuit was filed against Doug Phillips and Vision Forum by a woman who had worked as the Phillips family's nanny. Her suit alleged that Phillips had sexually abused her for years. Phillips acknowledged an "inappropriate relationship" but denied all charges of sexual abuse, calling them "sensationalist and suggesting that they are motivated by a desire for financial gain."

References

Bibliography

External links 
 Vision Forum Ministries – non-profit organization

Alternative education
Christian organizations based in the United States
Calvinist organizations established in the 20th century
Christian organizations established in 1998
Organizations based in San Antonio
Religious organizations disestablished in 2013